In poker, the term Triple Crown is used in three ways:
One is for winning three different events in three days at the same venue.
Another is for winning the WSOP Main Event, The Poker Players Championship, and WSOP Player of the Year in the same WSOP.
The final and more commonly used is for winning all three of the following across an entire career:
Any bracelet at a World Series of Poker event;
A Main Event on the World Poker Tour (WPT);
A Main Event on the European Poker Tour (EPT, rebranded as the PokerStars Championship for 2017 only).

So far, only nine players have completed the Triple Crown: Gavin Griffin, Roland De Wolfe, Jake Cody, Bertrand Grospellier, Davidi Kitai, Mohsin Charania, Harrison Gimbel, Niall Farrell and Roberto Romanello. In 2008, Griffin won his first World Poker Tour title, becoming the first to complete the feat.

On January 25, 2010, Cody won the EPT Deauville. He followed that up on September 4, 2010, Cody won the WPT London Poker Classic, and then, he completed the crown on June 4, 2011. It took him 1 year, 4 months, 11 days, which is the quickest of the nine.

Triple Crown winners
Information correct as of July 2020.

Kitai's WPT title was won in a 482 player invitational tournament.

Players one win away

Without WSOP bracelet

Without WPT Main Event title

Without EPT/PSC Main Event title

References

Poker gameplay and terminology